From the 50s and the 60s Fiat was the biggest manufacturer of trolleybuses in Italy. The company was partner with body makers such as Cansa, Casaro, Garavini, Macchi, Varesina, Viberti and electrical engine manufacturers Breda, CGE, Marelli and TIBB.

List
Fiat 461F Materfer CGE
Fiat 467F Materfer CGE
Fiat 488F Materfer CGE
Fiat 635F Varesina Breda
Fiat 635F Varesina CGE
Fiat 656F Cansa CGE
Fiat 656F Garavini CGE
Fiat 668F Cansa CGE
Fiat 668F Aerfer TIBB
Fiat 672F Varesina Breda
Fiat 672F Viberti CGE
Fiat 2401 Cansa CGE
Fiat 2401 Cansa TIBB
Fiat 2404 Cansa TIBB
Fiat 2405 Casaro CGE
Fiat 2405 Casaro TIBB
Fiat 2405 Macchi CGE
Fiat 2405 Macchi TIBB
Fiat 2411 Cansa CGE
Fiat 2411 Cansa TIBB
Fiat 2411 Cansa Marelli
Fiat 2411/1 Cansa CGE
Fiat 2472 Viberti CGE

Public transport
Fiat trolleybuses served in Italy in cities like Rome, Milan, Turin, Naples and towns like Florence, Cuneo, Verona, Bologna and other.

Outside Italy trolleybuses by Fiat had in: Greece, Croatia, Serbia, Switzerland, Egypt, Turkey, Brazil, Argentina, Uruguay, South Africa, Mexico.

Trolleybus manufacturers